Body Exit Mind was the second studio album released by the British indie rock band New Fast Automatic Daffodils, released on Play It Again Sam in Europe in October 1992, and on Elektra Records in March 1993 in the United States.

The record was produced by Craig Leon who is noted for producing the first three Ramones records as well as Blondie.

The album reached number 57 on the UK Album Chart.

Track listing 
 Bong
 It's Not What You Know
 Stockholm
 I Take You to Sleep
 Bruises
 Kyphos
 Beatlemania
 What Kind of Hell is This?
 American Money
 Missing Parts of Famous People
 Patchwork Lives
 Music

The CD release included a bonus CD EP, with the following tracks:
 How Much Longer Shall We Tolerate Mass Culture?
 Teenage Combo
 Exit Body, Exit Mind

CD alternative listing:
 Bong 4:05
 It's Not What You Know 4:07
 Stockholm 5:12
 I Take You To Sleep 3:52
 Bruises 6:58
 How Much Longer Must We Tolerate Mass Culture? 1:19
 Kyphos 4:44
 Teenage Combo 0:25
 Beatlemania 4:50
 What Kind Of Hell Is This? 0:39
 American Money 4:28
 Missing Parts Of Famous People 1:05
 Patchwork Lives 5:08
 Music 8:08
 Exit Body, Exit Mind 1:02

Personnel 
 Andy Spearpoint - vocals
 Dolan Hewison - guitar
 Justin Crawford - bass guitar
 Perry Saunders - drums
 Icarus Wilson-Knight - percussion

References 

1992 albums
New Fast Automatic Daffodils albums